CRV or CR-V may refer to:

Transportation
 Carlinville station (Amtrak code: CRV), Carlinville, Illinois, US
 Crew Return Vehicle, an emergency return vehicle to be docked at a space station as a lifeboat
 Honda CR-V, an SUV manufactured by Honda

Aviation
 Acropolis Aviation (ICAO code: CRV), UK; See List of airline codes (A)
 Cargo Ivoire (ICAO code: CRV), Ivory Coast; See List of airline codes (C)
 Crotone Airport or Aeroporto di Crotone-Sant'Anna (IATA airport code: CRV)

Science and technology
 Cheng rotation vane, a set of stationary vanes that eliminates flow turbulence in a piping system created by an elbow or tee 
 Component Recordable Video, a type of Laserdisc
 Chromium-vanadium steel (Cr-V, CrV, or CrV), a group of steel alloys
 Corvus (constellation), in the Southern Celestial Hemisphere

Other uses
 California Redemption Value, a fee paid on purchases of certain recyclable beverage containers in California
 Charles River Ventures, a venture capital firm
 Counter-Revolutionary Violence: Bloodbaths in Fact & Propaganda, a book by Noam Chomsky

See also
 Central retinal vein occlusion (CRVO), in ophthalmology
 CR-V3 battery
 CRV7 (Canadian Rocket Vehicle 7), a ground attack rocket